Yau-chun (Y.C.) Wong (1921–2000) was a Chinese-born American architect who practiced primarily in Chicago, Illinois. Wong was born in Canton, Guangdong, China and earned a bachelor's degree in the Department of Architecture, National Central University (now Southeast University School of Architecture) in 1945. After immigrating to the United States he furthered his study under Ludwig Mies van der Rohe at the Illinois Institute of Technology in Chicago. In 1951 he earned a master's degree and worked under Mies van der Rohe until 1959 when he started his own practice. Wong became known for his Atrium Houses during the 1960s.

References

1921 births
2000 deaths
Chinese emigrants to the United States
Chinese architects
Southeast University alumni
Illinois Institute of Technology alumni
Artists from Chicago
Artists from Guangzhou
20th-century American architects